Kenney Nunatak is a conspicuous nunatak rising in Waddington Glacier,  south-southwest of Ugolini Peak, in the Royal Society Range of Victoria Land, Antarctica. It was named by the Advisory Committee on Antarctic Names in 1994 after Frank J. Kenney, a United States Geological Survey (USGS) cartographer who was a member of a USGS field team for the International Global Positioning System (GPS) Campaign at Byrd Station, McMurdo Station, and in the Pine Island Bay area, 1991–92. The team established the first continuous-tracking GPS reference station in Antarctica.

References

Nunataks of Victoria Land
Scott Coast